Merrilliobryum fabronioides is a species of mosses in the family Myriniaceae. It is endemic to the Philippines, where it is known from a few locations in the mountains of northern Luzon. It is an endangered species found in habitat that is degraded by agriculture, logging, and mining.

References

Hypnales
Endemic flora of the Philippines
Endangered plants
Taxonomy articles created by Polbot